A discount function is used in economic models to describe the weights placed on rewards received at different points in time.

.

Total utility in the continuous-time case is given by

provided that this integral exists.  

Exponential discounting and hyperbolic discounting are the two most commonly used examples.

See also
Discounted utility
Intertemporal choice
Temporal discounting

References
 Shane Frederick & George Loewenstein & Ted O'Donoghue, 2002. "Time Discounting and Time Preference: A Critical Review," ;;Journal of Economic Literature;;, vol. 40(2), pages 351-401, June.

Intertemporal economics